Crime Club may refer to:

 Collins Crime Club (UK publishing imprint), British book marque for crime and mystery fiction from publisher Collins
 Doubleday Crime Club (US publishing imprint), American book marque for crime and mystery fiction from publisher Doubleday
 The Crime Club (radio series), U.S. radio program based on stories from the Doubleday Crime Club
 The Crime Club (film series), Universal Pictures film series based on stories from the Doubleday Crime Club
 MIT Crime Club (student club), student group at the Massachusetts Institute of Technology for promoting technology to help solve crime

See also
 Outlaw motorcycle club, criminal gang based around motorcycle riding members
 Criminal gang (disambiguation)
 Our Society, founded by Arthur Conan Doyle as "The Crimes Club"